Dame Anne Fyfe Pringle  (born 13 January 1955) is a British diplomat and the former HM Ambassador of the United Kingdom to the Russian Federation. From 2001 to 2004, Pringle was the British ambassador to the Czech Republic. Pringle presented her Letter of Credence to President of Russia Dmitry Medvedev on 16 January 2009.

Dame Anne was succeeded by Tim Barrow (now Sir Tim Barrow, KCMG) in November 2011. Already a Companion of the Order of St Michael and St George (CMG), she was advanced to become a Dame Commander of the Order of St Michael and St George (DCMG) in the 2010 New Year Honours. Pringle received an Honorary Doctorate from Heriot-Watt University in 2010.

In August 2016 Dame Anne was appointed as Senior Governor on the Court of the University of St Andrews, and as such is the working chairperson of the University Court, and presides over meetings of the Court in the absence of the Rector.

References

1955 births
Living people
Members of HM Diplomatic Service
Ambassadors of the United Kingdom to Russia
Ambassadors of the United Kingdom to the Czech Republic
Alumni of the University of St Andrews
Dames Commander of the Order of St Michael and St George
Place of birth missing (living people)
British women ambassadors
20th-century British diplomats
21st-century British diplomats